Colin Symm (born 26 November 1946) is an English former footballer who scored 8 goals from 102 appearances in the Football League playing as a midfielder for Sheffield Wednesday, Sunderland and Lincoln City. He also played non-league football for Gateshead, and Boston United,

References

1946 births
Living people
Footballers from Gateshead
English footballers
Association football forwards
Gateshead F.C. players
Sheffield Wednesday F.C. players
Sunderland A.F.C. players
Lincoln City F.C. players
Boston United F.C. players
English Football League players
Northern Premier League players
Association football midfielders